State Route 352 (SR 352) is a  state highway that exists completely within Unicoi County in the eastern portion of the U.S. state of Tennessee, the area commonly called Tri-Cities region.

Route description
SR 352 begins at a y-intersection with US 19W/SR 36 in the community of Temple Hill. The highway turns southwest to follow the former alignment of US 23 to pass through Flag Pond. In Flag Pond, it breaks away from the former US 23 alignment at another y-intersection, where it continues south into North Carolina as Old Asheville Highway. SR 352  then leaves Flag Pond and twists and turns its way through the mountainous terrain of Unicoi County. It ends at the North Carolina state line, where the roadway continues as NC 212.

SR 352 is a two-lane rural mountain highway for its entire length.

Major intersections

See also

References

352
Transportation in Unicoi County, Tennessee